The 1975 Northern Iowa Panthers football team represented the University of Northern Iowa as a member of the North Central Conference (NCC) during the 1975 NCAA Division II football season. Led by 16th-year head coach Stan Sheriff, the Panthers compiled an overall record of 9–3 with a mark of 6–1 in conference play, placing second in the NCC. Northern Iowa advanced to the NCAA Division II Football Championship playoff, losing in the quarterfinals to the eventual national runner-up, Western Kentucky. The team played home games at O. R. Latham Stadium in Cedar Falls, Iowa.

Schedule

References

Northern Iowa
Northern Iowa Panthers football seasons
Northern Iowa Panthers football